Didymochlamys is a genus of flowering plants in the family Rubiaceae. The genus is found from Nicaragua to Guyana and Ecuador.

There are two species in the genus. They are usually epiphytes that grow on trees. The inflorescence contains 2 to 5 flowers pressed between flattened green bracts.

Species 
 Didymochlamys connellii N.E.Br. - Colombia, Guyana, Venezuela
 Didymochlamys whitei Hook.f. - Colombia, Ecuador, Nicaragua, Panama

References

External links 
 Didymochlamys in the World Checklist of Rubiaceae

Rubiaceae genera
Taxa named by Joseph Dalton Hooker